Group 9 consisted of six of the 50 teams entered into the European zone: Albania, Armenia, Germany, Northern Ireland, Portugal, and Ukraine. These six teams competed on a home-and-away basis for two of the 15 spots in the final tournament allocated to the European zone, with the group's winner and runner-up claiming those spots.

Standings

Results

Notes

External links 
Group 9 Detailed Results at RSSSF

9
1996–97 in Albanian football
1997–98 in Albanian football
1996 in Armenian football
1997 in Armenian football
1996–97 in German football
qual
1996–97 in Northern Ireland association football
1997–98 in Northern Ireland association football
1996–97 in Portuguese football
1997–98 in Portuguese football
1996–97 in Ukrainian football
1997–98 in Ukrainian football